Synuchus nitidus is a species of ground beetle in the subfamily Harpalinae. It was described by Victor Motschulsky in 1861.

References

Synuchus
Beetles described in 1861